The Dau Giay-Dalat Expressway is a partially completed expressway in Vietnam. It will connect Dong Nai Province with Da Lat. It is a four-lane expressway with a maximum speed of 100 km/h, roughly paralleling National Road 20. The road is expected to be a strong stimulus for the development of Vietnam's Central Highlands region.

Development
The route yet to be built has been divided into three sections by the Ministry of Transport. The investment budget is sourced from a mixture of Build, Operate and Transfer contracts, Japanese development loans from JICA and direct state investment.
Dau Giay-Tan Phu
Construction of the 59.6 km long section between Dau Giay and Tan Phu is scheduled to begin in 2020 with a total investment of 7,000 billion VND.
Tan Phu-Bao Loc
The Tan Phu-Bao Loc section is planned at a development cost of 17,000 billion VND.
Bao Loc-Lien Khuong
This planned section has a total budget of 13,000 billion VND.
Lien Khuong-Da Lat
The 19.2 km long section between Lien Khuong Airport and Pass Prenn near Da Lat was completed in 2008.

References

Expressways in Vietnam